Leo Rangell (October 1, 1913 – May 28, 2011) was an American psychoanalyst and clinical professor of psychiatry at the University of California. He was also twice president of the International Psychoanalytical Association and the American Psychoanalytic Association, and was accorded the title "Honorary President" in 1997. Rangell died May 28, 2011 at the Ronald Reagan UCLA Medical Center in Los Angeles. He was 97.

Biography

Rangell was born in Brooklyn, New York, October 1, 1913 to parents who had recently immigranted from Eastern Europe.  He graduated from Boys High School and became a premed student at Columbia University (BS with honors, 1933).  He completed medical school at the University of Chicago in 1937.

Notable publications 

 The Mind of Watergate (1980) 
 My Life in Theory (2004)
 The Road to Unity in Psychoanalytic Theory (2006)

References

External links 
Leo Rangell, M.D  profile at sigourneyaward.org

1913 births
2011 deaths
American psychoanalysts
American psychiatrists
University of California faculty
Columbia College (New York) alumni
Pritzker School of Medicine alumni
Boys High School (Brooklyn) alumni